From March 11 to June 3, 1952, delegates were elected to the 1952 Republican National Convention.

The fight for the 1952 Republican nomination was largely between popular General Dwight D. Eisenhower (who succeeded Thomas E. Dewey as the candidate of the party's liberal eastern establishment) and Senator Robert A. Taft of Ohio, the longtime leader of the conservative wing. Foreign policy during the Cold War was a major point of contention, with Eisenhower taking an interventionist stance and Taft favoring greater caution and avoidance of foreign alliances. Eisenhower tended to accept many of the social welfare aspects of the New Deal, to which Taft was adamantly opposed.

Two other major candidate for the nomination, though never challenging Eisenhower or Taft, were Governor of California and Dewey's 1948 running-mate Earl Warren, and former Governor of Minnesota Harold Stassen, who had contended for the nomination in 1948 as well.

Taft, who was 62 when the campaign began and running his third presidential campaign, freely admitted that this would be his last chance to win the nomination. Taft's weakness, which he was never able to overcome, was the fear of many party bosses that he was too conservative and controversial to win a presidential election. The primaries were ultimately inconclusive, and the nomination was decided by a contest over delegates from Texas and Georgia; led by Dewey and Henry Cabot Lodge Jr., the Eisenhower campaign won a vote of the whole convention to award the contested delegates to Eisenhower, who carried the first ballot. The episode was reminiscent of the 1912 Republican National Convention forty years prior, where Taft's father won the nomination over Theodore Roosevelt by similar means.

In the general election on November 4, Eisenhower and his running mate, Senator Richard Nixon of California, defeated the Democratic party's ticket of Governor Adlai Stevenson II of Illinois, and Senator John Sparkman of Alabama.

Candidates 
The following leaders were candidates for the 1952 Republican presidential nomination:

Major candidates 
These candidates participated in multiple state primaries or were included in multiple major national polls.

Competing in primaries

Bypassing primaries 
The following candidates did not place their name directly on the ballot for any state's presidential primary, but may have sought to influence selection of un-elected delegates or support of uncommitted delegates.

Favorite sons 
The following candidates ran only in their home state's primary or caucus for the purpose of controlling its delegate slate at the convention and did not appear to be considered national candidates by the media.

 Businessman Riley A. Bender of Illinois
 Governor George Theodore Mickelson of South Dakota (Eisenhower surrogate)
Senator Wayne Morse of Oregon
 Representative Thomas H. Werdel of California (Taft surrogate)

Declined to run 
The following persons were listed in two or more major national polls or were the subject of media speculation surrounding their potential candidacy, but declined to actively seek the nomination.

Senator John W. Bricker of Ohio (ran for re-election)
Governor Thomas E. Dewey of New York (endorsed Eisenhower)
Governor Alfred E. Driscoll of New Jersey (endorsed Eisenhower)
Senator James H. Duff of Pennsylvania (endorsed Eisenhower)
Senator Henry Cabot Lodge Jr. of Massachusetts (endorsed Eisenhower)
House Minority Leader Joseph W. Martin Jr. of Massachusetts
Senator Kenneth S. Wherry of Nebraska

Polling

National polling

Primaries 
Eisenhower scored a major victory in the New Hampshire primary when his supporters wrote his name onto the ballot, giving him an upset victory over Taft. However, from there until the Republican Convention the primaries were divided fairly evenly between the two men, and by the time the convention opened the race for the nomination was still too close to call.

Statewide contests by winner
Statewide contest won by candidates

Italics indicate a write-in candidacy.

Total popular vote results

Primaries total popular vote results:
 Robert A. Taft - 2,794,736 (35.84%)
 Dwight D. Eisenhower - 2,050,708 (26.30%)
 Earl Warren - 1,349,036 (17.30%)
 Harold Stassen - 881,702 (11.31%)
 Thomas H. Werdel - 521,110 (6.68%)
 George T. Mickelson - 63,879 (0.82%)
 Douglas MacArthur - 44,209 (0.57%)
 Grant A. Ritter - 26,208 (0.34%)
 Edward C. Slettedahl - 22,712 (0.29%)
 Riley A. Bender - 22,321 (0.29%)
 Mary E. Kenny - 10,411 (0.13%)
 Wayne L. Morse - 7,105 (0.09%)
 Perry J. Stearns - 2,925 (0.04%)
 William R. Schneider - 580 (0.01%)

Republican National Convention

When the 1952 Republican National Convention opened in Chicago, most political experts rated Taft and Eisenhower as neck-and-neck in the delegate vote totals. Eisenhower's managers, led by Governor Dewey and Massachusetts Senator Henry Cabot Lodge, Jr., accused Taft of "stealing" delegate votes in Southern states such as Texas and Georgia. They claimed that Taft's leaders in these states had illegally refused to give delegate spots to Eisenhower supporters and put Taft delegates in their place. Lodge and Dewey proposed to evict the pro-Taft delegates in these states and replace them with pro-Eisenhower delegates; they called this proposal "Fair Play". Although Taft and his supporters angrily denied this charge, the convention voted to support Fair Play 658–548, and Taft lost many Southern delegates; this decided the nomination in Eisenhower's favor. However, the mood at the convention was one of the most bitter and emotional in American history; in one speech Senator Everett Dirksen of Illinois, a Taft supporter, pointed at Governor Dewey on the convention floor and accused him of leading the Republicans "down the road to defeat", and mixed boos and cheers rang out from the delegates. In the end Eisenhower took the nomination on the first ballot; to heal the wounds caused by the battle he went to Taft's hotel suite and met with him. The Convention then chose young Senator Richard Nixon of California as Eisenhower's running mate; it was felt that Nixon's credentials as a slashing campaigner and anti-Communist would be valuable. Most historians now believe that Eisenhower's nomination was primarily due to the feeling that he was a "sure winner" against the Democrats; most of the delegates were conservatives who would probably have supported Taft if they felt he could have won the general election. The balloting at the Republican Convention went: (Richard C. Bain and Judith H. Parris, Convention Decisions and Voting Records, pp. 280–286):

Freshman California Senator Richard Nixon was nominated for Vice President, also with notable Dewey's support. Republican politicians thought that his political experience, aggressive style (he was known as strongly anti-communist) and political base on the West would help political newcomer Eisenhower.

Endorsements

 Mark Hatfield 
 Murray Rothbard 
 Herbert Hoover

See also
1952 Democratic Party presidential primaries

Notes

References

Further reading